This is a list of flag bearers who have represented Indonesia at the Olympics.

Flag bearers carry the national flag of their country at the opening ceremony of the Olympic Games.

Notes

See also
Indonesia at the Olympics

References

Indonesia at the Olympics
Indonesia
Olympic flagbearers
Olympic flagbearers